Lewis S. Wisner (August 11, 1841 - October 6, 1906) was an American soldier and recipient of the Medal of Honor who fought in the American Civil War.

Biography 
Lewis Wisner was born on August 11, 1841, in Wallkill, New York. After enlisting on August 12, 1862, he served in 124th New York Volunteer Infantry Regiment starting as a sergeant on September 5, 1862. He had reached the rank of First Lieutenant by his Medal of Honor action at the Battle of Spotsylvania Court House, Virginia on May 12, 1864. He died on October 6, 1906, and is now buried in Hillside Cemetery, Middletown, New York.

Medal of Honor Citation 
For extraordinary heroism on 12 May 1864, in action at Spotsylvania, Virginia, while serving as an engineer officer voluntarily exposed himself to the enemy's fire.

References 

1841 births
1906 deaths
American Civil War recipients of the Medal of Honor
United States Army Medal of Honor recipients